Robert Roux O'Donnell (born 12 September 1994) is a New Zealand cricketer.

Under-19s career
In 2014 Under-19 World Cup, he was named captain of the New Zealand team. O'Donnell was part of the squad for the previous edition of the tournament in 2012 in which New Zealand reached the semi-finals.
O'Donnell scored unbeaten century helped the team comprehensively defeat the United Arab Emirates Under-19s by 112 runs in Sharjah.

Domestic career
He made 80 for New Zealand XI against an Indian attack that read Zaheer Khan, Umesh Yadav, Ishant Sharma, Ravichandran Ashwin and Ishwar Pandey in a tour match. In June 2018, he was awarded a contract with Auckland for the 2018–19 season. In September 2018, he was named in the Auckland Aces' squad for the 2018 Abu Dhabi T20 Trophy.

In June 2020, he was offered a contract by Auckland ahead of the 2020–21 domestic cricket season.

See also
 List of Auckland representative cricketers

References

External links
 
 

1994 births
Living people
New Zealand cricketers
Auckland cricketers